Railway Express may refer to:

Rail Express - a railway magazine in the United Kingdom
Railway Express Agency - a package delivery network in the United States
Railway Express FC - a former football club based in Ndola in Zambia